The 3rd NKP Salve Challenger Trophy was an Indian domestic cricket tournament that was held in Mohali from 28 September to 1 October 1996. The series involved the domestic and national players from India allocated in India Seniors, India A, and India B. India Seniors won the Challenger trophy after defeating India B by 8 wickets in the final.

Squads

Points Table

Matches

Group stage

Final

References 

Indian domestic cricket competitions